Kate Braverman (February 5, 1949 – October 12, 2019) was an American novelist, short-story writer, and poet. Los Angeles is the focus for much of her writing.

Biography
Kate Braverman was born in Philadelphia, Pennsylvania, on February 5, 1949. She moved to Los Angeles in 1958 with her family.
Braverman earned a B.A. in Anthropology from University of California, Berkeley and an M.A. in English from Sonoma State University. She was a member of the Venice Poetry Workshop, Professor of Creative Writing at California State University, Los Angeles, staff faculty of the UCLA Writer's Program and taught privately a workshop which included Janet Fitch, Cristina Garcia and Donald Rawley. She died in Santa Fe, New Mexico, on October 12, 2019.

Works

Novels

Short stories
"Squandering The Blue", KGB Bar Lit
 
 
 A Good Day For Seppuku. City Lights Publishers. 2018. .

Poetry

Memoir

Anthologies

The Best American Short Stories 1991

Awards
Braverman won three Best American Short Stories awards, an O. Henry Award, and a Carver Short Story Award, as well as the Economist Prize and an Isherwood Fellowship.  She was also the first recipient of Graywolf Press's Creative Nonfiction Award for Frantic Transmissions to and from Los Angeles: An Accidental Memoir, published in February 2006.

References

External links
 Kate Braverman's official site
 Interview with Kate Braverman at Word Riot
 Interview with Kate Braverman at Bookslut.com
 Interview with Kate Braverman at SmallSpiralNotebook.com
 Interview with Kate Braverman at Zulkey.com
 Interview with Kate Braverman by Erin Jourdan
 "Interview", Zyzzyva, Spring 2004

1949 births
2019 deaths
American women novelists
American women short story writers
American women poets
Writers from Philadelphia
UC Berkeley College of Letters and Science alumni
Sonoma State University alumni
20th-century American novelists
21st-century American novelists
Poets from California
20th-century American women writers
21st-century American women writers
20th-century American poets
21st-century American poets
20th-century American short story writers
21st-century American short story writers
Novelists from Pennsylvania